Plague of Butterflies is the first EP by the melodic death metal/doom metal band Swallow the Sun. It was released on September 17, 2008 in Finland and September 23, 2008 worldwide through Spinefarm Records. The song, "Plague of Butterflies", runs about 35 minutes in length and is divided into three parts, the first being titled "Losing the Sunsets," second being "Plague of Butterflies" and the last titled "Evael 10:00."

The bonus tracks on this EP are from the Demo "Out of This Gloomy Light" released in 2003.
The tracks from this demo were composed and written by Juha Raivio.

Track listing
All tracks written by Juha Raivio.

Chart positions

References

Swallow the Sun albums
2008 EPs
Number-one singles in Finland